Sobrevive is the second album of the Chilean pop rock band Kudai released on June 16, 2006. Debuted at number one in their navite country and certified platinum and sold 350,000 copies worldwide.

Album information
This album is the last record on which Nicole Natalino sang. She left the group due to personal problems. After the departure of Nicole, Gabriela Villalba replaced her and re-record the album featuring Gabriela's voice.

The first single is "Déjame Gritar" which went #1 in Chile and Argentina. The video of the single features Nicole before her departure and also hit #1 spot on many TV channels and programs like MTV Argentina 'Los 10+ Pedidos' and MTV Centro 'Top 20'.

Track listing
"Intro" ("Intro") (Guz) – 0:42
"Tal Vez" ("Maybe") (Guz, Dr. Alfa) – 3:29
"Llévame" ("Take Me Away") (Guz) – 3:44
"Ya No Quiero Más" ("I Don't Want Anymore") (Guz, Juan José Arranguiz) – 3:14
"Aún" ("Still") (Guz) – 4:19
"Déjame Gritar" ("Let Me Scream") (Guz, Dr. Alfa) – 3:17
"Hoy No Estas" ("You're Not Here Today") (Guz) – 4:12
"Si He Tocado El Suelo" ("Even If I Touched The Rock Bottom") (Guz, Dr. Alfa, Mai) – 3:04
"Volar" ("Fly") (Guz, Dr. Alfa) – 3:41
"Siempre" ("Always") (Guz) – 4:16
"Okey" ("OK!") (Guz, Dr. Alfa) – 3:25
"Ven" ("Come") (Guz) – 4:16
"Llévame" (Acústico) ("Take Me" (Acoustic)) (Guz) – 3:43
"Volar" (Acústico) ("Fly" (Acoustic)) (Guz) – 3:27
"No Estaré Allí" (featuring Ilona) ("I Won't Be There") (Richard Narváez, Ilona) – 4:33
"En La Vereda Del Frente" (featuring Leo García) ("On the sidewalk in front") (Leo García) – 3:43
"Quiero Mis Quinces" (Show  MTV Latin America) ("I Want My 15s") (Guz, Dr. Alfa) – 3:26

Sobrevive re-edition
This is the re-edition of Kudai's sophomore album which features new member voice, the Ecuadorian Gabriela Villalba, ex-member of Ecuador Popstars group Kiruba. The second version of the album was released on September 26, 2006 in Chile and on December, 2006 in Mexico.

To relaunch the album and promote for the second time, the video of "Déjame Gritar" was made it again, replacing Nicole's parts and put Gabriela's performance. The second single is "Llévame" and this performs at all Gabriella Villalba. The video also features the new member and it was filmed in Los Andes in Chile.

This version of the record is promoted in Latinamerica. In addition to replace Nicole's voice, the track listing also changed a little bit. The song "Si He Tocado El Suelo" was removed and put a new one called "Tú"

Track list
"Intro" ("Intro") (Guz) – 0:42
"Tal Vez" ("Maybe") (Guz, Dr. Alfa) – 3:29
"Llévame" ("Take Me Away") (Guz) – 3:44
"Ya No Quiero Más" ("I Don't Want Anymore") (Guz, Juan José Arranguiz) – 3:14
"Aún" ("Still") (Guz) – 4:19
"Déjame Gritar" ("Let Me Scream") (Guz, Dr. Alfa) – 3:17
"Hoy No Estas" ("You're Not Here Today") (Guz) – 4:12
"Volar" ("Fly") (Guz, Dr. Alfa) – 3:41
"Siempre" ("Always") (Guz) – 4:16
"Okey" ("OK!") (Guz, Dr. Alfa) – 3:25
"Ven" ("Come") (Guz) – 4:16
"Llévame" (Acústico) ("Take Me" (Acoustic)) (Guz) – 3:43
"Volar (Acústico)" ("Fly" (Acoustic)) (Guz) – 3:27
"No Estaré Allí" (featuring Ilona) ("I Won't Be There") (Richard Narváez, Ilona) – 4:33
"En La Vereda Del Frente" (featuring Leo García) ("On the sidewalk in front") (Leo García) – 3:43
"Quiero Mis Quinces" (Show  MTV Latin America) ("I Want My 15s") (Guz, Dr. Alfa) – 3:26
"Tú" ("You") (Guz, Koko Stambuk) – 4:05

Personnel
Choir arrangement: Rodrigo Apablaza
Vocal lead: Kudai
Arranger: Juan José Aranguiz
Keyboards, programming, vocal arrangement, editing: Juan José Aranguiz
Mixing, coros: Juan José Aranguiz, recording: Juan José Aranguiz
Bass (electric): Daniela Castro and Fernando Sepulveda
Art coordinator: Verónica Correa
Bass (electric): Alejandro Gonzalez
Mixing, recording: Pablo Gonzalez
Engineer: Andrés Mayo
Make-up: Vanessa Souza
Executive producer: Alejandro Varela
Art direction, creative consultant: Pablo Vega

Chart

References

2006 albums
Kudai albums